Thomas Poynton (second ¼ 1885 – second ¼ 1942) was an English professional rugby league footballer who played in the 1900s and 1910s. He played at representative level for England and Yorkshire, and at club level for Wakefield Trinity (Heritage № 155), as a three-quarter, i.e.

Background
Tommy Poynton's birth was registered in Pontefract district, West Riding of Yorkshire, and his death aged 57 was registered in Pontefract district, West Riding of Yorkshire, England.

Playing career

International honours
Tommy Poynton won a cap for England while at Wakefield Trinity in 1911 against Australia.

County honours
Tommy Poynton won cap(s) for Yorkshire while at Wakefield Trinity.

Challenge Cup Final appearances
Tommy Poynton played left-, i.e. number 4, in Wakefield Trinity's 0–6 defeat by Hull F.C. in the 1914 Challenge Cup Final during the 1913–14 season at Thrum Hall, Halifax, in front of a crowd of 19,000.

County Cup Final appearances
Tommy Poynton played left-, i.e. number 4, in Wakefield Trinity's 8–2 victory over Huddersfield in the 1910 Yorkshire County Cup Final during the 1910–11 season at Headingley Rugby Stadium, Leeds on Saturday 3 December 1910.

Club career
Tommy Poynton made his début for Wakefield Trinity during February 1906, he appears to have scored no drop-goals (or field-goals as they are currently known in Australasia), but prior to the 1974–75 season all goals, whether; conversions, penalties, or drop-goals, scored 2-points, consequently prior to this date drop-goals were often not explicitly documented, therefore '0' drop-goals may indicate drop-goals not recorded, rather than no drop-goals scored. In addition, prior to the 1949–50 season, the archaic field-goal was also still a valid means of scoring points.

Testimonial match
Tommy Poynton's Testimonial match at Wakefield Trinity was joint testimonial for; Arthur Burton, Arthur Kenealy "Nealy" Crosland, William "Billy" Lynch, and Thomas "Tommy" Poynton, and took place against Yorkshire at Belle Vue, Wakefield on Wednesday 27 April 1922.

Outside Rugby League
Tommy Poynton was permanently disabled during World War I.

Genealogical information
Thomas Poynton's marriage to Clara Lavinia (née Smith) (birth registered during third ¼ 1888 in Pontefract district – death registered during fourth ¼ 1966 (aged 78) in Pontefract district ) was registered during third ¼ 1919 in Pontefract district, they had one child; Joseph Poynton (birth registered during fourth ¼ 1920 in Pontefract district). Thomas Poynton is related to the rugby league footballer Harold Poynton.

References

External links

1885 births
1942 deaths
British military personnel of World War I
England national rugby league team players
English rugby league players
Rugby league centres
Rugby league players from Pontefract
Rugby league wingers
Wakefield Trinity players
Yorkshire rugby league team players